The Carstens Farmstead is a collection of historic buildings located south of Shelby, Iowa, United States. Johan Carstens was a German immigrant who spent eight years living and working in Milwaukee, Chicago, and Davenport, Iowa before settling in Pottawattamie County in 1871, where he established this farm. He bought  of land from the Chicago, Rock Island and Pacific Railroad, and continued to farm it until he and his wife retired in 1905. The farm buildings include: the original farmhouse (1872), the 1888 farmhouse with the summer kitchen, an outhouse, garage (1917), granary (1898), horse and dairy barn (1886), beef cattle barn (1903), beef cattle barn (1917), forge and workshop (1910, with additions), windmill (1916), feed shed (1919), hog house (1919), poultry house, machine shed (1920), the cob house (1926), and a corn crib (1930). The buildings were listed together on the National Register of Historic Places in 1979.

References

Farm museums in Iowa
Museums in Pottawattamie County, Iowa
National Register of Historic Places in Pottawattamie County, Iowa
Farms on the National Register of Historic Places in Iowa